The United States Virgin Islands competed in the Summer Olympic Games for the first time at the 1968 Summer Olympics in Mexico City, Mexico.

Athletics

Men
Track & road events

Sailing

Open

Weightlifting

Men

References
 Official Olympic Reports

External links
 

Nations at the 1968 Summer Olympics
1968 Summer Olympics
1968 in the United States Virgin Islands
1968 in United States Virgin Islands sports